Benito Rodríguez Valtodano or Benito Rodríguez Baltodano (died 1629) was a Roman Catholic prelate who served as Bishop of Nicaragua (1620–1629).

Biography
Benito Rodríguez Valtodano was ordained a priest in the Order of Saint Benedict. On 27 August 1620, he was selected by the King of Spain and confirmed by Pope Gregory XV on 17 March 1621 as Bishop of Nicaragua.
In 1622, he was consecrated bishop by Alfonso del Galdo, Bishop of Comayagua. He served as Bishop of Nicaragua until his death in 1629.

References

External links and additional sources
 (for Chronology of Bishops) 
 (for Chronology of Bishops) 

17th-century Roman Catholic bishops in Nicaragua
Bishops appointed by Pope Gregory XV
1629 deaths
Benedictine bishops
Roman Catholic bishops of León in Nicaragua